The Tour of Trakya is an international road cycling race organized by the Turkish Cycling Federation at East Thrace in northwestern Turkey. It is part of the UCI Europe Tour having a rating of 2.2.

The beginning of the Tour of Trakya goes back to the 1980s.
It gained an international status in 2010 with its first edition held between May 28–31, at which 74 racers competed.

2010
The first edition's route was as follows:

  (Tekirdağ - Malkara - Hayrabolu - Tekirdağ)
  (Tekirdağ - Marmaraereğlisi - Çorlu - Tekirdağ)
  (Tekirdağ - Hayrabolu - Lüleburgaz - Muratlı - Tekirdağ)
  (Tekirdağ - Şarköy)

2011
The second edition's route was as follows:
  (Tekirdağ - Marmaraereğlisi - Çorlu - Tekirdağ)
  (Çorlu - Çerkezköy - Saray - Vize - Lüleburgaz)
  (Lüleburgaz - Babaeski - Kırklareli - Edirne)
  (Edirne - Havsa - Babaeski - Hayrabolu - Tekirdağ)

2012
The third edition's route was as follows:
  (Tekirdağ - Marmaraereğlisi - Çorlu - Tekirdağ)
  (Çorlu - Çerkezköy - Saray - Vize - Lüleburgaz)
  (Lüleburgaz - Babaeski - Kırklareli - Edirne)
  (Edirne criterium race)

2013
The race was cancelled or removed from the UCI cycling calendar.

Winners

References

Trakya
Recurring sporting events established in 2010
2010 establishments in Turkey
Sport in Tekirdağ
Sport in Kırklareli
Sport in Edirne
UCI Europe Tour races
Spring (season) events in Turkey